Çamlık is a village in the Giresun District of Giresun Province. Its population is 215 (2021). It is 20 km from Giresun.

Population

References 

Villages in Giresun Province